Sandro Akhrikovich Tsveiba (born 5 September 1993) is a Ukrainian-born Russian former football defender. He is a son of former international Akhrik Tsveiba.

Career
Tsveiba spent 13 seasons in the youth ranks of FC Lokomotiv Moscow, amassing 59 matches and 5 goals between 2011 and 2013 for the "double"/youth team. Not breaking into the club's first team, he left the club and  made his debut in the third-tier Russian Second Division for FC Rus Saint Petersburg on 15 July 2013 in a game against FC Spartak Kostroma. After half a season there, he moved again, to the second-tier FC SKA-Energiya Khabarovsk, playing only three matches in the season.

In the summer of 2014, he moved abroad, to the Hungarian side Újpest FC. Despite making the first-team squad in 22 league matches, he only entered the game twice, for a total of 7 minutes in play. his only full match for Újpest FC was in a cup game against FC Ajka, where he made an assist.

In the summer of 2015, he moved abroad again, signing for the Croatian side NK Osijek.

On 17 February 2017, he signed with the Russian Premier League club FC Krylia Sovetov Samara. On 24 June 2017, he signed with FC Dynamo Saint Petersburg.

On 19 July 2019, he signed with Swedish club AFC Eskilstuna until the end of 2019.

References

External links
 Career summary by sportbox.ru  
 
 
 

1993 births
Footballers from Kyiv
Living people
Russian footballers
Russia youth international footballers
Russia under-21 international footballers
Association football defenders
Russian people of Abkhazian descent
Ukrainian people of Abkhazian descent
Russian expatriate footballers
Expatriate footballers in Hungary
Expatriate footballers in Croatia
Expatriate footballers in Kazakhstan
Expatriate footballers in Sweden
Expatriate footballers in Belarus
Nemzeti Bajnokság I players
Kazakhstan Premier League players
Allsvenskan players
Újpest FC players
FC SKA-Khabarovsk players
FC Aktobe players
FC Dynamo Saint Petersburg players
FC Lokomotiv Moscow players
NK Osijek players
FC Fakel Voronezh players
PFC Krylia Sovetov Samara players
AFC Eskilstuna players
FC Isloch Minsk Raion players
Russian expatriate sportspeople in Hungary
Russian expatriate sportspeople in Croatia
Russian expatriate sportspeople in Kazakhstan
Russian expatriate sportspeople in Belarus
Russian expatriate sportspeople in Sweden